Lai Haraoba is a festival associated with the Meitei people celebrated to please the Umang Lai, the traditional deities of Sanamahism. Translated, Lai Haraoba means merry making of the Gods in Meiteilon. In this festival, the people worship Sanamahi, Pakhangba, Nongpok Ningthou and around 364 Umang Lais or the deities of the forest. This festival is organized as a piece of memory of the contribution of Gods in creating the Universe and also it is celebrated in the memory of the development of plants, animals and human beings.

Four types of Lai Haraoba are prevalent in the Meitei society, namely, Kanglei Haraoba, Moirang Haraoba, Kakching Haraoba and Chakpa Haraoba. Kanglei Haraoba is performed in many parts of the valley of Manipur. Moirang Haraoba is only in Moirang, Kakching Haraoba is held in Kakching and Chakpa Haraoba is celebrated at Andro, Phayeng, Sekmai, Koutruk, Khuukhul, Leimaram and Tairenpokpi.

Origin

Lai Haraoba (
) is a ritualistic festival of the Meiteis observed since ancient times. It is a ritual enactment of the creation myth. It mirrors the entire culture of Manipur and depicts the close affinities between the hill and plain people. It is a combination of religious recitations, traditional music and dance, traditional social values and ancient cultural aspects.

The rituals within the festival are the same except in some items or hymns, such as ikouba, ikourol, and yakairol at the beginning and mikon thagonba, ngaprum tanba at the end of the festival. In the performances, the evolution story with the amorous love-affairs of Nongpok Ninghthou and Panthoibi is depicted and played equally in all kinds of lai haraoba. According to folklore, the gods held the first Lai Haraoba  on the Koubru Hill so that their descendants would imitate them by performing the same rites.

Lai Haraoba Ishei
Lai Haraoba Ishei is a famous folk song played mainly during Lai Haraoba. This song contains lyrics with veiled references to erotic mysticism. The main quality of the song is the rhythm in its tune.

See also
Khamba Thoibi
 Lists of deities in Sanamahism
 Sanamahi creation myth

References

Further reading
 Kshetrimayum, Otojit. (2014). Ritual, Politics and Power in North East India: Contexualising the Lai Haraoba of Manipur. New Delhi: Ruby Press & Co.

Festivals in Manipur
Sanamahism